Flight 723 may refer to:

American Airlines Flight 723, crashed on 16 September 1953
Delta Air Lines Flight 723, crashed on 31 July 1973 

0723